Bartosz Kopacz (born 21 May 1992) is a Polish professional footballer who plays as a defender for Zagłębie Lubin.

Career

Club
In July 2011, he was loaned to Ruch Radzionków on a one-year deal.

On 20 June 2017 he signed a contract with Zagłębie Lubin.

Career statistics

References

External links
 

Polish footballers
1992 births
Living people
People from Jastrzębie-Zdrój
Sportspeople from Silesian Voivodeship
GKS Jastrzębie players
Górnik Zabrze players
Ruch Radzionków players
Zawisza Bydgoszcz players
Bruk-Bet Termalica Nieciecza players
Zagłębie Lubin players
Lechia Gdańsk players
Ekstraklasa players
I liga players
II liga players
Association football defenders